Aaron Juan Saucedo, (born April 6, 1994) also known as the Maryvale Street Shooter and the Serial Street Shooter is an accused American serial killer who was linked to twelve separate shootings resulting in nine deaths and three injuries across Phoenix, Arizona from August 2015 to June 2016, mainly in the Maryvale neighborhood.

On May 8, 2017, Saucedo was charged with the shootings, and an additional two homicides. Currently, Aaron Juan Saucedo awaits trial in the Maricopa County Jail, which due to COVID-19 concerns has been set for February 2024, where he faces charges for first-degree murder, drive-by shooting, attempted murder, aggravated assault, discharging a firearm at a non-residence, endangerment, and discharging a firearm at a residence.

Early life

Childhood 
Aaron Juan Saucedo was born on April 6, 1994 to noted musician José Juan Segura and Ms. Saucedo. Around the time he was eight years old, Saucedo went to live with his mother in Phoenix, Arizona where he attended an elementary school in the Madison School District from 2002 to 2008, where a classmate described him as a "sweet" and friendly child who exhibited no violent behavior.

Adolescence 
Saucedo then attended North High School from 2009 to 2010 for his sophomore year, before transferring for unknown reasons to Central High School for a single semester before withdrawing completely in January 2011; during this period, he attended a troubled youth program. Saucedo was not known as a troublemaking student, nor was he particularly remembered by anyone, staff or student, during his high school years. 

It is not currently known whether or not Saucedo obtained his high school diploma, though it is known his transcripts were sent to a charter school in February 2011 one month after leaving Central High School.

Adulthood
Residing with his mother, Saucedo worked a series of occupations before settling into a job as a local bus driver for the city of Phoenix through a temp agency. He kept this job from July to August 2015, committing his first murder on August 11, 2015 with a Hi-Point 9mm pistol. Also in August, Saucedo was caught driving through a red light while driving the bus, for which he pleaded guilty to the red light violation in February 2016, receiving a fine of $238. After losing his job, Saucedo found work at a home remodeling company where he made approximately $1000 per month. Planning to continue his murders, Saucedo spent little time on social media and continued to live with his mother after her 61-year-old boyfriend (Saucedo's first victim) Raul Romero's death. 

Sixteen days after the murder of Raul Romero, Saucedo sold the Hi-Point 9mm pistol to a pawn shop; he then bought a Bryco Arms .380 pistol from the same pawn shop on September 1, 2015. On his way to Phoenix from Mexico, Saucedo's father seized the Bryco Arms .380 pistol from his son "for safety concerns," keeping it until police came to retrieve it as evidence days after Saucedo's arrest on April 22, 2017. Evidently, authorities determined through extensive firearm examination and ballistic testing that it had been the same weapon used to murder his second victim Jesse Olivas, who was shot multiple times.

Shootings

2015 
The first shooting occurred on August 12 at approximately 10:56 p.m. on 900 E. Colter St., damaging the 61-year-old owner's antique dresser and front security screen door. While the house was damaged, the victim was not injured. Allegedly, Saucedo used the Hi-Point 9mm pistol he would go on to use to murder Raul Romero.

The first homicide, that of 61-year-old Raul Romero, occurred on August 16, 2015. Saucedo approached him with the 9mm handgun and opened fire as he stood in the driveway. This was the first shooting which suspect Aaron Saucedo (see below) was originally charged.

2016 
On January 1, 22-year-old Jesse Olivas was shot to death on a sidewalk at 2200 N. 58th Dr. at approximately 12:44 in the morning; .380 bullet casings were found beside the body of Olivas. Allegedly, Saucedo shot him before approaching him at close range, where he kicked him before fleeing.

On March 17, near 1100 E. Moreland St., a 16-year-old boy was shot and wounded while walking down the street at about 11:30 p.m. A second 17-year-old boy was then taunted with the firearm by the suspect. This was believed to be the first shooting during the original investigation. At the scene, 9mm bullet casings were discovered.

On March 18, at 11:30 p.m., 21-year-old Michael Aldama was waiting for a friend in the late night at 4300 N. 73rd Ave. He was then approached by a moving vehicle, in which a "scrawny" white or Hispanic male opened fire on Aldama. He was shot, and subsequently wounded.

On April 1, 21-year-old Diego Verdugo-Sanchez was approached by a moving vehicle that resembled a four-doored sedan; he was shot multiple times and subsequently killed at around 8:23 p.m. while visiting his pregnant fiancée and her family. Near the scene, 9mm bullet casings were collected.

On the early morning of April 19, 55-year-old Krystal Annette White was found shot to death at 500 N. 32nd St; 9mm casings were discovered near the scene.

On June 3, at 9:50 p.m., 32-year-old Horacio Pena was shot to death outside his house at 6700 W. Flower St. after returning home from work. He was approached by a white vehicle, and sustained multiple gunshot wounds resulting in his death.

On June 10, at 9:30 p.m., 19-year-old Manuel Castro Garcia was killed outside his house as both the suspect's vehicle and Garcia's vehicle were moving. A police officer nearby heard the gunshots and rushed to the scene, but the killer had already fled. Witnesses saw a man in a dark four-doored sedan flee the scene.

On June 12, at 2:15 a.m., the suspect shot at a 2006 Chevy truck, causing considerable damage. At approximately 3:05 a.m., the shooter opened fire on an unoccupied vehicle at 6200 W. Mariposa Drive. Approximately half an hour later, the shooter killed 33-year-old Stefanie Ellis and her 12-year-old daughter Maleah outside their home. Their 31-year-old friend Angela Linner was also shot; she initially survived, but died from her wounds three weeks later. Investigators found 9mm casings near the scene.

On July 11, the shooter opened fire on a car at 5:26 p.m. occupied by 21-year-old Arnol Castillo Rojas and a four-year-old boy, but neither was injured. Surveillance footage of a black BMW sedan was caught, and 9mm bullet casings were discovered near the scene.

Investigation 
The murders of Verdugo-Sanchez, Pena, Garcia, and the triple homicide were linked together due to the fact that they all occurred in Maryvale and due to similarity in modus operandi. The other shootings were later connected based on M.O. and location as well, though the murder of White and the first shooting occurred outside of Maryvale.

A suspect was described by witnesses as a lanky dark-haired man in his early 20s. He was also described as being under 5 ft 10 in (1.78 m) tall and Hispanic. However, police have not been able to rule out the possibility of multiple people being involved in the killings, as a car possibly containing more than one person was seen leaving the scene of two of the shootings, and three gunmen were reported by witnesses to have carried out the killings of the Ellises and Linner. However, police have stated that it is "unlikely" multiple people are involved in the killings.

The suspect is believed to be using multiple vehicles, including a black BMW 5 Series and a white Cadillac or Lincoln.

A composite sketch of the shooter was released by authorities on August 3.

On October 19, 2016, police released recordings of 9-1-1 calls related to the case in an attempt to stir up more leads for the case. In December 2016, they said they had no active leads in regards to the investigation.

Psychological profile 
FBI criminal profiler Brad Garrett believed that the shooter is a "thrill killer" and is seeking "intimacy" in the attacks as he shoots the victim from close range. Garrett also believed that the shooter is likely inserting himself in the investigation or attending police-community meetings about the killings.

2017 developments

Frank Taylor
The Phoenix Police Department commented publicly in March 2017 that Frank Taylor was a potential suspect in the shootings. He was killed after attempting to rob a woman at gunpoint a few weeks after the last known shooting; the would-be victim fatally shot him with her own gun, which she carried in a holster on her hip. After his death, Taylor was identified by several people as a potential suspect.

Aaron Saucedo 

On April 22, 2017, a "person of interest" (POI) in the case was taken into custody on unrelated charges. The 21-year-old man who was targeted in the final known shooting had been shown a line-up of six potential suspects, one of whom was the POI later taken into custody.

The POI was identified two days later as 23-year-old Aaron Saucedo, who had initially been arrested for the 2015 murder of 61-year-old Raul Romero, who was a friend of his mother. A 9mm Hi-Point pistol owned by Saucedo was confirmed, through ballistics, to be the same weapon that killed Romero. Saucedo also owned a black BMW 5 Series sedan, the same type of car that the shooter was reported to have been driving, and bore a resemblance to the composite sketch of the shooter released by police.

Raul Romero was shot to death with the same type of weapon used in the Phoenix freeway shootings, a similar crime spree in 2015. However, the Arizona Department of Public Safety denied Saucedo had any link to those shootings, and that they still considered another man as a suspect. Police said there was no evidence to link Saucedo with those shootings as well.

Saucedo was arraigned for the murders on May 8. Initially, he was only charged with the murder of Raul Romero. However, on June 30, he received an additional eight counts of first-degree murder, six counts of committing a drive-by shooting, two counts of attempted first-degree murder, two counts of aggravated assault, and one count each of endangerment and discharging a firearm at a structure. On July 6, Saucedo pleaded not guilty to the charges against him. His court appearances were frequently postponed, with the latest scheduled date being November 29, 2017. His trial is now scheduled for 2024.

See also 
 Serial Shooter, a serial killer duo in Phoenix in 2005–2006 who had a similar M.O.

General:
 List of serial killers in the United States
 List of serial killers by number of victims

References

1994 births
2015 in Arizona
2016 in Arizona
2010s in Phoenix, Arizona
American serial killers
Attacks in the United States in 2015
Attacks in the United States in 2016
Living people
Male serial killers